Drahovce is a village and municipality in Piešťany District in the Trnava Region of western Slovakia.

History
In historical records the village was first mentioned in 1309.

Geography
The municipality lies at an altitude of 150 metres and covers an area of 24.042 km2. It has a population of about 2587 people.

Genealogical resources

The records for genealogical research are available at the state archive "Statny Archiv in Bratislava, Slovakia"

 Roman Catholic church records (births/marriages/deaths): 1787-1907 (parish A)

See also
 List of municipalities and towns in Slovakia

References

External links
https://web.archive.org/web/20071116010355/http://www.statistics.sk/mosmis/eng/run.html
Surnames of living people in Drahovce

Villages and municipalities in Piešťany District